Fred Charles Thomsen (April 25, 1897 – January 7, 1986) was an American football player and coach. From 1929 to 1941, he was the head football coach at the University of Arkansas, compiling a record of 56–61–10. In 1949, he became the head football coach at Southwest Missouri State College, now Missouri State University, where he served until 1952. His record at Southwest Missouri State was 19–17–4. Thomsen's career record as a head coach was 75–78–4.  Thomsen played for the Rock Island Independents in the National Football League (NFL) for one season in 1924.

Arkansas
In 1933, Thomsen's Razorbacks had the best record in the Southwest Conference, but Arkansas had to forfeit their first conference championship because Thomsen played Heinie Schleuter, an ineligible athlete. Schleuter had told Thomsen he could play, but actually had no remaining eligibility.  A member of the SMU Mustangs noticed him as a former Nebraska Cornhusker, forcing the Hogs to give up their first conference title. The Razorbacks won their first conference championship in 1936.  However, TCU received the Southwest Conference's bid to the first Cotton Bowl, leaving Arkansas out of the bowl picture.  Thomsen popularized the forward pass at Arkansas, attempting over 300 aerials, which caught fire across the Southwest Conference. Thomsen used two quarterbacks, Dwight Sloan for wet weather, and Jack Robbins for dry.

Head coaching record

College

Notes

References

External links
 
 

1897 births
1986 deaths
American football ends
Arkansas Razorbacks athletic directors
Arkansas Razorbacks football coaches
Missouri State Bears football coaches
Nebraska Cornhuskers football players
Rock Island Independents players
High school football coaches in Nebraska
People from Minden, Nebraska
Coaches of American football from Nebraska
Players of American football from Nebraska